This list of traditional territories of the original peoples of North America gives an overview of the names of the indigenous "countries" of North America. In this sense, "country" refers to the name of the land...the ground...the territory ... the homeland of a nation, rather than the name of the nation ("tribe") itself.  This article is only about the name for the land of a nation.

For example, the traditional territory (country/land) of the Ho-Chunk (Winnebago) Nation is called Waaziija, meaning "the Grand Pinery". In English, the land of an indigenous nation was historically, and sometimes still is, referred to as a "country", such as "(the) Winnebago country". Some Latinate forms exist in English such as "Iroquoia", "Huronia", and "Apacheria".

The distinction between nation and land is like the Polish people versus the land of Poland, the Māori people versus Aotearoa, or the Saami people versus Sápmi (Saamiland).

List of traditional territories

Criteria for inclusion
For the purpose of this list, "nation" refers to the historic, whole national identities, rather than to the fragmented "reservation nations" or "bands". The whole nations are what John Beaucage, Grand Council Chief of the Anishinabek Nation, refers to as "true nations" in contrast with the fragmented "First Nations":

Or what the Government of Quebec calls "the 11 aboriginal nations of Québec" in contrast with their component "55 aboriginal communities".
And so the criteria for inclusion is not the same as what are named "Indian tribes" by the U.S. Federal Register and the National Congress of American Indians (NCAI), or what are called "First Nations" by the Canadian government and Assembly of First Nations (AFN). It would be interesting to compile the names for the "band territories" of the 633 fragmented First Nations of the AFN, or the names of the "reservation territories" of the 632 fragmented Indian Nations of the NCAI, but that is beyond the scope of this article, except as side notes in the "further information" column.

So this list does not include the names for reservations or reserves, but only of the entire national homeland (or the homeland of a confederated identity such as the Haudenosaunee Confederacy or Colville tribes). For example, this list wouldn't give the Cherokee name for the Qualla Boundary reservation, but only the name for "the Cherokee country" as a whole. Ideally a single name could conceivably encompass not only the Contact-era ancestral territory, but also any area which at some time or another was conceived to be part of the national domain, such as post-Removal lands.

The names do not have to be from olden days. The names could be recently coined and still be included in this list.

Compiling a list such as this can be a difficult and controversial process, as it requires some discernment as to what are the "whole nations" — the "true nations" in Beaucage's words.

Notes

References

North America, Traditional territories of the indigenous peoples
Indigenous peoples of North America
History of indigenous peoples of North America
Lists of countries in the Americas
 
Indigenous peoples in Canada-related lists
Native American-related lists